The 2018 IIHF World Championship Division III was an international ice hockey tournament run by the International Ice Hockey Federation. It was held in Cape Town, South Africa and the qualification tournament in Sarajevo, Bosnia and Herzegovina after the original hosts, Abu Dhabi, United Arab Emirates, withdrew their application.

Georgia won the tournament and were promoted to Division II.

Kuwait and Turkmenistan made their debut in the World Championships, with both playing in the qualification tournament. Turkmenistan won their first ever game in the World Championships, defeating the United Arab Emirates and later went on to win the qualification and be promoted to next year's Division III.

Division III

Participants

Match officials
4 referees and 7 linesmen were selected for the tournament.

Referees
 Zsolt Csomortani - Did not attend the championships
 Miroslav Iarets
 Richard Magnusson
 Alexey Roshchyn

Linesmen
 Daniel Beresford
 Jonathan Burger
 Matthias Cristeli
 Maximilian Gatol
 Artsiom Labzov
 Gregor Miklič
 Marcin Polak

Standings

Results
All times are local (UTC+2).

Awards and statistics

Awards
Best players selected by the directorate:
 Best Goaltender:  Charl Pretorius
 Best Defenceman:  Martin Boyadjiev
 Best Forward:  Aleksandr Zhuzhunashvili
Source: IIHF.com

Scoring leaders

GP = Games played; G = Goals; A = Assists; Pts = Points; +/− = Plus/minus; PIM = Penalties in minutes; POS = Position
Source: IIHF.com

Goaltending leaders
Only the top five goaltenders, based on save percentage, who have played at least 40% of their team's minutes, are included in this list.

TOI = Time on ice (minutes:seconds); SA = Shots against; GA = Goals against; GAA = Goals against average; Sv% = Save percentage; SO = Shutouts
Source: IIHF.com

Division III qualification tournament

Participants

Match officials
3 referees and 4 linesmen were selected for the tournament.

Referees
 Martin Christensen
 Stefan Hogarth
 Paweł Meszyński

Linesmen
 Tomáš Brejcha
 Ilya Khohlov
 Vytautas Lukoševičius
 Maarten van der Acker

Standings

Results
All times are local (UTC+1).

Awards and statistics

Awards
Best players selected by the directorate:
 Best Goaltender:  Edis Pribišić
 Best Defenceman:  Dmitriy Savin
 Best Forward:  Ahmet Gurbanov
Source: IIHF.com

Scoring leaders

GP = Games played; G = Goals; A = Assists; Pts = Points; +/− = Plus/minus; PIM = Penalties in minutes; POS = Position
Source: IIHF.com

Goaltending leaders
Only the top five goaltenders, based on save percentage, who have played at least 40% of their team's minutes, are included in this list.

TOI = Time on ice (minutes:seconds); SA = Shots against; GA = Goals against; GAA = Goals against average; Sv% = Save percentage; SO = Shutouts
Source: IIHF.com

References

2018
Division III
International ice hockey competitions hosted by South Africa
International sports competitions hosted by Bosnia and Herzegovina
Sports competitions in Cape Town
Sports competitions in Sarajevo
2018 in Bosnia and Herzegovina sport
2018 in South African sport
April 2018 sports events in Europe